Jama Masjid is a station on the Delhi Metro system. The Heritage Line stretch of the Delhi Metro was flagged off by Union Minister M. Venkaiah Naidu and Delhi Chief Minister Arvind Kejriwal on 28-May-2017. The corridor will be operational from 28-May-2017, the Delhi Metro Rail Corporation (DMRC) announced on 26-May-2017.

An extension of the Violet Line (ITO-Escort Mujeser), this entirely underground section comprises four stations—Kashmere Gate, Dilli Gate, Jama Masjid and Lal Qila.

History
The ITO-Kashmere Gate line was thrown open for public on Sunday. With its launch, the Metro makes inroads into old Delhi or the ‘Walled City’ with four stations—Delhi Gate, Jama Masjid, Red Fort and Delhi Gate.

The station

Station layout

Facilities

Connections

Bus
Delhi Transport Corporation bus routes number 19B, 26, 118EXT, 120B, 171, 172, 185, 210, 213, 213A, 214, 214CL, 246, 246CL, 258SPL, 261, 347, 348, 402CL, 403, 403CL, 404, 405, 405A, 405STL, 411, 419, 425, 425CL, 429, 429CL, 429LSTL, 429STL2, 449CL, 502, 605, 632, 729, 753, 807A, 838, 838A, 901, 901CL, serves the station from Jama Masjid stop.

Entry/Exit

See also

Delhi
List of Delhi Metro stations
Transport in Delhi
Delhi Metro Rail Corporation
Delhi Suburban Railway
Delhi Monorail
Delhi Transport Corporation
Central Delhi
Old Delhi
Chandni Chowk
National Capital Region (India)
List of rapid transit systems
List of metro systems

References

External links

 Delhi Metro Rail Corporation Ltd. (Official site) 
 Delhi Metro Annual Reports
 
 UrbanRail.Net – descriptions of all metro systems in the world, each with a schematic map showing all stations.

Delhi Metro stations
Railway stations in New Delhi district
Railway stations in India opened in 2017